Napo is a province in Ecuador. Its capital is Tena. The province contains the Napo River. The province is low developed without much industrial presence. The thick rainforest is home to many natives that remain isolated by preference, descendants of those who fled the Spanish invasion in the Andes, and the Incas years before. In 2000, the province was the sole remaining majority-indigenous province of Ecuador, with 56.3% of the province either claiming indigenous identity or speaking an indigenous language.

This province is one of the many located in Ecuador's section of the Amazon Rainforest.

In Napo province are also Antisana Ecological Reserve, Sumaco Napo-Galeras National Park, and Limoncocha National Biological Reserve.

Cantons 
The province is divided into five cantons. The following table lists each with its population at the 2001 census, its area in square kilometres (km²), and the name of the canton seat or capital.

See also 
 Apostolic Vicariate of Napo, the coinciding Roman Catholic missionary circonscription
 Provinces of Ecuador
 Cantons of Ecuador
 A'i (Cofan) people

References

Further reading
Juncosa, Jose E. (ed.) (1997). Viajes por el Napo: cartas de un misionero (1924-1930). Quito: Abya-Yala. 

 
Provinces of Ecuador